U.S. Games Corporation was a video game company founded by Donald Yu, which originally produced handheld electronic sports games. It pivoted to focus exclusively on video game software in 1981, and was acquired by cereal company Quaker Oats in 1982 to develop games for the Atari 2600. U.S. Games released their first game, Space Jockey for the Atari 2600, in January 1982, followed by 13 more cartridges in 1982 and 1983.  Space Jockey and other early titles used the Vidtec brand name.

Although sometimes cited as an example of non-technology companies attempting to produce video games, Quaker purchased U.S. Games to work with its Fisher-Price toy brand and compete with rival cereal company General Mills's Parker Brothers division.

Unlike U.S. Games, Parker Brothers was experienced in producing family and licensed games. It had a very successful 1982 in the video game market, with hits like Frogger and  The Empire Strikes Back. U.S. Games's titles sold poorly, and Quaker closed the division during the video game crash of 1983. "None of our games became a hit," said spokesman Ronald Bottrell. "Instead of pouring in a lot more capital, we decided to drop it".

Published titles
In order of product number:
Space Jockey
Sneak n' Peek
Word Zapper
Commando Raid
Name This Game
Towering Inferno
M.A.D.
Gopher
Squeeze Box
Eggomania
Picnic
Piece o' Cake
Raft Rider
Entombed

References

Video game companies established in 1982
Video game companies disestablished in 1983
Defunct video game companies of the United States
Video game development companies
Quaker Oats Company
1982 establishments in the United States
Atari 2600